James McDowell (October 13, 1795 – August 24, 1851) was the 29th Governor of Virginia from 1843 to 1846 and was a U.S. Congressman from 1846 to 1851.

Biography
McDowell was born at "Cherry Grove," near Rockbridge County, Virginia, on  October 13, 1795. He attended a classical school at Greenville, Virginia, a private school at Brownsburg, Washington College (now Washington and Lee University), Lexington, Virginia, and Yale College He graduated from Princeton University in 1817 and studied law. He was admitted to the bar but did not practice. He was a member of the State house of delegates 1831–1835 and again in 1838. He was chosen as Governor of Virginia in 1843. He was elected as a Democrat to the Twenty-ninth Congress to fill the vacancy caused by the death of William Taylor. He was reelected to the Thirtieth and Thirty-first Congresses and served from March 6, 1846, to March 3, 1851. McDowell died on his estate "Col Alto" near Lexington on August 24, 1851. He was interred in Presbyterian Cemetery.

McDowell was the brother-in-law of Senator Thomas Hart Benton. McDowell County, Virginia (now part of West Virginia) was formed in 1858 and named in honor of Governor McDowell.

References

External links
A Guide to the Executive Papers of Governor James McDowell, 1843-1845 at The Library of Virginia
James McDowell helped shape history of Rockbridge County from The News Leader
Congressional Biography

Democratic Party governors of Virginia
Princeton University alumni
Washington and Lee University alumni
1795 births
1851 deaths
People from Rockbridge County, Virginia
Yale University alumni
Democratic Party members of the Virginia House of Delegates
Democratic Party members of the United States House of Representatives from Virginia
19th-century American politicians
Preston family of Virginia